Michael Murphy (1918 – 1 January 2018) was an Irish hurler whose league and championship career with the Tipperary and Clare lasted from 1943 until 1949.

Born in Kilmaley, County Clare, Murphy first played competitive hurling in his youth. He first appeared on the Kilmaley team in the mid-1930s before winning a county intermediate championship medal in 1938. Murphy's prowess lead to him being selected for the Clarecastle senior team at a time when the club was allowed to select players from neighbouring areas. As a member of the Clarecastle team he ended up on the losing side in three senior championship finals between 1936 and 1939. A move to Thurles in 1940 saw Murphy join the Thurles Sarsfields team and go on to win three successive county senior championship medals between 1944 and 1946. He ended his career with the Faughs club in Dublin.

Success at club level brought Murphy to the attention of the county team selectors. He arrived on the inter-county scene at the age of twenty-five when he was first selected for the Tipperary senior team for the 1943 championship. A mainstay of the team over the following five years, Murphy won his sole All-Ireland in 1945, having earlier claimed a Munster medal. He later played with the Clare senior team before retiring from inter-county hurling after the 1949 championship. 

Murphy died on 1 January 2018. At the time of his death he was the second oldest living All-Ireland medal winner.

Honours

Thurles Sarsfields
Tipperary Senior Hurling Championship (3): 1944, 1945, 1946

Tipperary
All-Ireland Senior Hurling Championship (1): 1945
Munster Senior Hurling Championship (1): 1945

References

1918 births
2018 deaths
Kilmaley hurlers
Clarecastle hurlers
Thurles Sarsfields hurlers
Faughs hurlers
Tipperary inter-county hurlers
Clare inter-county hurlers
All-Ireland Senior Hurling Championship winners